is a 1923 book by the German author Arthur Moeller van den Bruck, whose ideology heavily influenced the Nazi Party. The book formulated an "ideal" of national empowerment, which found many willing adherents in a Germany desperate to rebound from the Treaty of Versailles.

For Moeller van den Bruck, Germany's great misfortune lay in the political system created by the Weimar Republic, which had competitive parties and liberal ideologies. An admirer of Benito Mussolini, he called for a strong leader.

Concept 
Moeller van den Bruck's empire is not a state in the usual sense of the word but the ideal condition and the only way in which the scattered German people can achieve a common purpose and destiny. However, that should not be a limited state, and the Second Reich established by Otto von Bismarck was an imperfect empire, as it did not include Austria, which survived on from "our First Empire", side by side with "our Second Empire". According to the author, "Our Second Empire was a Little-German Empire which we must consider only as a stepping stone on our path to a Greater German Empire".

The weak Weimar Republic needs to be replaced by a new revolution from the right, according to van den Bruck. He also calls for a new political movement that will embrace both Prussian socialism and nationalism, a unique form of German fascism. He takes all of his philosophical cues from the work of Nietzsche, "who stands at the opposite pole of thought from Marx". The one contemporary politician that he praises above all the others is Benito Mussolini.

Implications 
On the eve of the book's publication, van den Bruck inserted a preface in which he wrote, "The Third Reich is but a philosophical idea and not for this world, but for the hereafter. Germany could well perish dreaming the Third Reich dream". To pursue the philosophical idea, he believed that Germany would need an Übermensch of the type described by Nietzsche but that the individual was not Adolf Hitler or anyone else living.

Soon after the collapse of the Munich Putsch, he wrote: "There are many things that can be said against Hitler, and I have sometimes said them. But one thing you have to give him credit for: he is a fanatic in his devotion to Germany. He is undone, though, by his proletarian primitive ways. He does not know how to give an intellectual basis to his Nazi party. Hitler is all passion but lacks sense or proportion. A heroic tenor, not a hero. (Meaning, in an operatic sense, an aspiring but ultimately comical figure full of pathos rather than an actual protagonist)". Hitler, in the eyes of van den Bruck, was no Mussolini. Those were the last words that the author is known to have written before his suicide in 1925.

References 
Fritz Stern. The Politics of Cultural Despair: A Study in the Rise of the Germanic Ideology. University of California Press, 1974. 
Stan Lauryssens. The Man Who Invented the Third Reich. History Press, 2011.

External links 
English translation at archive.org

1923 non-fiction books
Nazi books